Barbara Haworth-Attard (born July 25, 1953) is a Canadian children's writer who lives in London, Ontario, Canada.

Works 
The Three Wishbells - 1995
Dark of the Moon - 1995
Home Child - 1996
TruthSinger - 1996
Buried Treasure - 1998
WyndMagic - 1999
Love-Lies-Bleeding - 1999
Flying Geese - 2001
Irish Chain - 2002
Theories of Relativity - 2003 (nominated for a Governor General's Award)
A Trail of Broken Dreams: The Gold Rush Diary of Harriet Palmer (Dear Canada) - 2004
Forget-Me-Not - 2005
A Is For Angst - 2007
My Life from Air-Bras to Zits - 2009
Haunted - 2009
To Stand on My Own: The Polio Epidemic Diary of Noreen Robertson (Dear Canada) - 2010

References

External links

 
 

1953 births
Living people
Canadian children's writers